Big Cat Records is an Atlanta-based hip-hop record label distributed by Tommy Boy Records. The label was founded in 1999 by The “ Kings of The South” better known as Melvin "Mel Man" Breeden & Marlon "Big Cat" Rowe. Big Cat Records is best known for the success of Gucci Mane, whose records on the label have sold over 30 million units. Other artists with releases on Big Cat include Yung Ralph, Pretty Ricky, Khia, Buju Banton, Maceo, Black Magic, Rasheeda, and Freekey Zekey.

References

External links

Record labels established in 1999
American independent record labels
1999 establishments in Georgia (U.S. state)